Mohamad-Ali Keshavarz (April 15, 1930 – June 14, 2020) was an Iranian actor. Keshavarz, Ali Nasirian, Ezatollah Entezami, Jamshid Mashayekhi and Davoud Rashidi are known as "the five most important actors in the history of Iranian cinema" because of their influence.

Early life
He was born on 15 April 1930 in Sichan (neighbourhood), Isfahan. He was the second child of the family of Keshavarz, an artificer family.

Career
Mohammad Ali Keshavarz graduated from Art School for Acting. He started stage acting in 1960 and began film acting with Night of Hunchback (1964, Farrokh Ghaffari). He was one of the most experienced and prominent actors of Iranian cinema. He has also appeared in a few television series.

Personal life
He was divorced and had one daughter who lives in Austria. Keshavarz was hospitalized in August 2011 after a heart attack.
He died on June 14, 2020 in Atieh Hospital in Tehran at the age of 90 following a long illness.

Selected filmography

References

External links

 Naghsh Āfarin-i az Esfahan (A Character Actor from Esfahan), in Persian, Jadid Online, 27 January 2009, .A series of photographs of Mohammad-Ali Keshavarz, old and new, Jadid Online: .

1930 births
2020 deaths
Actors from Isfahan
Iranian male film actors
Iranian male stage actors
Iranian male television actors
20th-century Iranian male actors
21st-century Iranian male actors
Recipients of the Order of Culture and Art
Iranian Science and Culture Hall of Fame recipients in Cinema